WKIP (1450 AM) is a commercial radio station licensed to Poughkeepsie, New York. The station is owned by iHeartMedia and broadcasts at 1,000 watts from a two-tower array adjacent to its radio studios in the Arlington section of the Town of Poughkeepsie. 
It uses a directional antenna in the daytime, but changes to a non-directional antenna at night, an unusual switch from standard practice where many AM stations are non-directional by day and directional at night.  Programming is also heard on FM translator W253BV at 98.5 MHz and on WJIP 1370 AM in Ellenville, New York.

Weekdays begin with a local morning show, "Hudson Valley Focus Live with Tom Sipos."  The rest of the day features nationally syndicated shows, mostly from co-owned Premiere Networks, including Sean Hannity, Glenn Beck, Mark Levin, Clay Travis & Buck Sexton, Jesse Kelly, Coast to Coast AM with George Noory and This Morning, America's First News with Gordon Deal.  Weekends feature shows from Kim Komando, At Home with Gary Sullivan, Leo Laporte-The Tech Guy, Bill Handel on the Law, Sunday Nights with Bill Cunningham, Somewhere in Time with Art Bell and The Jesus Christ Show.  Some weekend hours are paid brokered programming.  Most hours begin with world and national news from Fox News Radio.

Translator
To supplement coverage, WKIP programming is also heard on an FM translator station on 98.5 MHz.

History

Early years
Originally owned by Poughkeepsie Newspaper Incorporated, WKIP signed on the air on June 6, 1940, with 250 watts of power at 1420 kilocycles. It was the first radio station in Dutchess County since the move of WOKO from Beacon to Albany a decade earlier. Like many other "local" frequency stations, the Federal Communications Commission had it move to a new frequency in 1941, after the NARBA treaty and realignment, 1450 kHz.  WKIP began as an NBC Blue Network affiliate, carrying its schedule of dramas, comedies, news, sports, game shows, soap operas and big band broadcasts during the Golden Age of Radio.  In 1945, the Blue Network became today's ABC Radio Network.  WKIP's involvement with ABC would last for the remainder of the 20th Century.

With the shift of network programming from AM to TV, WKIP evolved into a full service Middle of the Road and news format in the 1950s, a time where WKIP also added FM coverage when it purchased the former WHVS at 104.7 MHz in 1958. Rechristened WKIP-FM, the station was sold a decade later and is now WSPK.

Top 40 era
WKIP maintained its original format and ownership until late 1967 when the station was sold to Star Broadcasting, which changed the format the next year to Top 40.  Around the same time, the ABC Radio Network switched to four sub-networks. WKIP signed up with the Top 40-leaning American Contemporary Network feed. The station was not successful with its new format against competitor 950 WHVW and that October returned to its prior MOR format.

In 1970, WKIP was sold again, this time to Olympian Broadcasting (to whom Star had sold WKIP-FM to two years earlier and who would resell that station to WBNR owner Lance Broadcasting).  Modifying the format to full service adult contemporary, WKIP rose from being in last place to first place with a combination of increased local involvement and help from format changes at WHVW and WEOK, until the mid-1980s.

Switch to talk
When Richard Novick purchased WKIP from Olympian in 1987, assorted changes started to take place starting with Novick allowing veteran morning host Van Risthie to leave for WHVW. This move plus the imminent decline of full-service AM formats led WKIP to go through a short-lived Fun and Games (hybrid oldies/talk) format with the station going to a talk radio format in 1989. At that time, Novick launched FM station 92.1 WRNQ, which had the spirit of WKIP's former format, as well as Van Ritshie. WRNQ was an automated station.  Ritshie also served as a voiceover artist for imaging for WRNQ.

The talk radio format would last for the entire 1990s, surviving a simulcast attempt with the Novick-controlled 96.9 MHz which also sported the WKIP-FM calls. After Straus Media purchased Novick's stations in November 1996, elements of WKIP's programming began to be heard on sister stations in Ellenville, Hudson, and Catskill.

Adult standards
WKIP and all of Straus's stations were sold to Clear Channel Communications (now iHeartMedia) in June 2000 with Clear Channel taking control of the stations that October. With the ownership change came a new format, the "Music of Your Life" adult standards format, as part of the Hudson Valley Nostalgia Network (a simulcast, minus commercials, with WELV in Ellenville, WGHQ in Kingston, and WHUC in Hudson).

Return to talk
The "Nostalgia Network" was dismantled in 2004 with WKIP keeping the standards format for three more years.  Then in October 2007, the station returned to talk radio programming, carrying mostly shows from iHeart's Premiere Radio Networks.

On June 10, 2008, WKIP dropped Quinn and Rose and began running the syndicated Don Imus morning show until October 1, 2012, when he was replaced by Hudson Valley Focus Live with Tom Sipos.

References

External links
WKIP Website

KIP
Radio stations established in 1940
1940 establishments in New York (state)
IHeartMedia radio stations
News and talk radio stations in the United States